Mount Goldthwait is a prominent mountain (3,815 m) located 2.5 nautical miles (4.6 km) south of Mount Dalrymple in the north part of the Sentinel Range, Antarctica. Discovered by the Marie Byrd Land Traverse Party of 1957–58, under Charles R. Bentley, and named for Richard P. Goldthwait, consultant, Technical Panel on Glaciology, U.S. National Committee for the IGY, and later Director, Institute of Polar Studies, Ohio State University.

See also
 Mountains in Antarctica

References

Ellsworth Mountains
Mountains of Ellsworth Land